Now That's What I Call Music! 47, released on August 6, 2013, is the 47th edition of the Now! series in the United States. The album features the number-one Billboard Hot 100 hit, "When I Was Your Man", by Bruno Mars.

Now! 47 debuted at number two on the Billboard 200 albums chart with sales of 82,000 copies in its first week of release.

Track listing

Reception

Andy Kellman of Allmusic notes the continued dominance of "bulky but swift dance-pop" in Now! 47 with country and rap being virtually shut out.

Chart performance

References

2013 compilation albums
 047
EMI Records compilation albums